Pathari State was established by the Nawabzada Hayder Mohammad Khan of Orakzai Clan Mirazikhel tribe. The State of Bhopal and Rahatgarh later Rahatgarh state become Pathari after losing rule over Rahatgarh by East India Company was founded in 1723 by Sardar Dost Muhammad Khan, from Tirah in Afghanistan, a descendant of the Mirazi Khel branch of the Warakzais (Orakzai) Pathans. He entered the service of Emperor Aurangzeb and had been appointed Governor of Bhairsa. Taking advantage of the disintegrating of the Mughal Empire, he declared his independence and found a separate state. Bhopal and Rahatgarh divided between two sons of Nawab Dost Mohammad Khan Nawab Yar Mohammad Khan got reign over Bhopal State and Nawab Sultan Mohammad Khan over Rahatgarh later became Pathari State

Following Indian independence in 1947, the last ruler of Pathari Nawab Abdul Rahim Khan signed the instrument of accession to the Union of India on 15 June 1948. The former state was incorporated into the new state of Madhya Bharat, which subsequently became Madhya Pradesh state on 1 November 1956.

See also
History
Pathari was a princely state merged in india in 1948 founded by Nawab Hayder Mohammad Khan descendentof Nawab Dost Mohammad khan of Orakzai clan Mirazikhel tribe the founder of Bhopal state. The last ruler of Pathari state was Nawab Abdul Rahim Khan. Pathari was a subordinate state ruling under Bhopal Agency or Nawab of Bhopal

List of rulers of Pathari State 
 1794-1859 Haydar Muhammed Khan
 1859-31 Jul 1913 Abd al-Karim Khan
 31 Jul 1913-1957 Muhammed Abd ar-Rahim Khan
 1957-4 Aug 2010 Asif Muhammed Khan
 4 Aug 2010-Date Zaib Muhammed Khan

References

Umaria district
Princely states of India
States and territories established in 1794
Pashtun dynasties
Muslim princely states of India
1794 establishments in India